(Hugh) Glencairn Balfour Paul   (23 September 1917 – 2 July 2008) was a British Arabist and diplomat. He served as the British Ambassador to Iraq, Jordan and Tunisia before becoming an academic at Exeter University.

Biography
The son of John William Balfour Paul, he was born in Moniaive in Dumfriesshire, educated at Lime House school near Carlisle, then at Sedbergh School, before going to Magdalen College, Oxford, in 1936, to read Classics.  He served with the Argyll and Sutherland Highlanders during World War II before being sent east to Egypt and then on to Sudan to the Sudan Defence Force.  After the war he served the Sudan Political Service as a District Commissioner in the Blue Nile and Darfur provinces. Before leaving Sudan in 1954, he set out on a camel trek to explore the foothills of eastern Ennedi in nearby Chad. After some days alone he met up with his local guide, Ordugu, who had worked with Wilfred Thesiger on his expedition to the Tibesti Mountains decades earlier.

On returning to Britain he joined the Diplomatic Service. Following a first posting in Santiago he became First Secretary in Beirut and later Political Agent in Dubai, followed by a brief stint in Bahrain as Deputy to William Luce. He was appointed Ambassador to Iraq in 1969, Ambassador to Jordan in July 1972 and then Ambassador to Tunisia 1975-77.

Having retired from the diplomatic service aged 60, Balfour Paul became Director-General of the Middle East Association in London before joining Exeter University as a Research Fellow in the Centre for Arab Gulf Studies. On the day before his death in July 2008, Balfour Paul was present at the opening of an exhibition at the Center of his photographs of the Trucial States taken in the 1950s and 1960s.  Whilst at Exeter he produced the volume The End of Empire in the Middle East (1991), and the Middle East section of The Oxford History of the British Empire. He also wrote his memoirs, Bagpipes in Babylon (2006) and a collection of poetry, A Kind of Kindness (2000).

Honours
  Companion of the Order of St Michael and St George (CMG) - 1968

References
BALFOUR-PAUL, (Hugh) Glencairn, Who Was Who, A & C Black, 1920–2014; online edn, Oxford University Press, April 2014

External links
Telegraph obituary
Personal and literary papers of Glencairn Balfour-Paul at the library of Exeter University

1917 births
2008 deaths
People educated at Sedbergh School
Alumni of Magdalen College, Oxford
Sudan Political Service officers
British expatriates in Chile
British expatriates in Lebanon
British expatriates in the United Arab Emirates
Ambassadors of the United Kingdom to Iraq
Ambassadors of the United Kingdom to Jordan
Ambassadors of the United Kingdom to Tunisia
Argyll and Sutherland Highlanders officers
British Army personnel of World War II
Companions of the Order of St Michael and St George